László Vajda (born 16 May 1954) is a Hungarian former figure skater. He is a ten-time Hungarian national champion. He placed in the top ten at five European Championships and at the 1975 World Championships. His best ISU Championship result, fifth, came at the 1975 Europeans in Copenhagen, Denmark.

Vajda served as Hungary's flag bearer at the 1976 Winter Olympics in Innsbruck, Austria. He placed tenth in the compulsory figures before withdrawing from the competition.

Vajda has worked as a skating coach. One of his students was Zsolt Kerekes.

14 times Jump Rope World Champion Vivien Vajda is the daughter of László Vajda.

Competitive highlights

References 

1954 births
Figure skaters at the 1976 Winter Olympics
Hungarian male single skaters
Living people
Figure skaters from Budapest
Olympic figure skaters of Hungary